Pristimantis eurydactylus is a species of frog in the family Strabomantidae.
It is found in Brazil and Peru.
Its natural habitats are tropical moist lowland forests and montane forests.

References

 Rodríguez, L., Martinez, J.L., Gascon, C., Jungfer, K.-H., Monteza, J.I. & Angulo, A. 2004.  Eleutherodactylus eurydactylus.   2006 IUCN Red List of Threatened Species.   Downloaded on 22 July 2007.

eurydactylus
Amphibians of Brazil
Amphibians of Peru
Amphibians described in 1992
Taxonomy articles created by Polbot